Male Homosexuality in Four Societies: Brazil, Guatemala, the Philippines and the United States is a 1985 work about male homosexuality by the sociologists Frederick L. Whitam and Robin Mathy.

Summary

The authors discuss male homosexuality in four societies: Brazil, Guatemala, the Philippines, and the United States.

Reception
Male Homosexuality in Four Societies received a mixed review from the sociologist Barbara Risman in Social Forces. The book was also reviewed by Evelyn Blackwood in the gay magazine The Advocate. In the American Journal of Sociology, it received a notice as an important new book, and a review from the sociologist John Gagnon.

Risman wrote that the book provides the "strongest social-scientific argument yet made for the essentialist paradigm of sexuality" according to which sexual orientation is biologically innate" and "raises hard questions that cannot be ignored". However, she maintained that its arguments "ultimately fails on logical, theoretical, and empirical grounds." In her view, while it deserved to be commended for its complex "multi-method, cross-cultural" design, the work still suffered from "serious problems of sampling bias and analytic technique". She questioned the value of its finding that the gay men in their samples reported more "cross-gender interests" than the heterosexual controls, and accused its authors of "disregard for the large body of scholarship on sex/gender systems".

References

Bibliography
Books

 

Journals

  
  
  
  

1985 non-fiction books
Books by Frederick L. Whitam
Books by Robin Mathy
English-language books
Gay non-fiction books
Sociology books